Sergei Gennadyevich Romanov (born 11 March 1983) is a former Russian football player.

References

1983 births
Living people
Russian footballers
FC Moscow players
FC Sheksna Cherepovets players
Russian Premier League players

Association football defenders